Hardeep Singh Grewal (born 1960) is an Indian field hockey player. He competed at the 1984 Summer Olympics in Los Angeles, where the Indian team placed fifth. He completed 10th from Govt. School PAU. After he studied at Arya college. He played in Hockey team. And represented district , state , country at many levels.

References

Olympic field hockey players of India
Indian male field hockey players
Field hockey players at the 1984 Summer Olympics
1960 births
Living people
Field hockey players at the 1986 Asian Games
Asian Games medalists in field hockey
Asian Games bronze medalists for India
Medalists at the 1986 Asian Games